Godrich Gardee is a South African politician who is the former Secretary-General of the Economic Freedom Fighters (EFF). He became involved in politics in 1985 and has Higher National Diploma in Accounting and National Park Auditing.

Gardee was succeeded as Secretary-General by Marshall Dlamini in December 2019. He resigned as an MP on 28 February 2020.

Gardee's daughter, Hillary Gardee, a 28-year-old IT graduate, was abducted and murdered in Mbombela. Passers-by found her lifeless body several days later at the edge of a forest on a deserted stretch of the Sabie road.

References

Living people
Economic Freedom Fighters politicians
Year of birth missing (living people)
Members of the National Assembly of South Africa